Alfred Gilbert Aronowitz (May 20, 1928 – August 1, 2005) was an American rock journalist best known for introducing Bob Dylan to The Beatles in 1964.

Early life and education
Aronowitz was born in Bordentown, New Jersey, and earned a degree in journalism from Rutgers University in 1950.

Career
He worked for various New Jersey newspapers in the 1950s before moving to the New York Post, where in 1959 he wrote a 12-part series on the Beat Generation, in the process becoming friends with Allen Ginsberg and Jack Kerouac.

In the early 1960s he wrote for the Saturday Evening Post; while covering the Beatles, he introduced them and Bob Dylan in a New York City hotel room on August 28, 1964. According to his own journal entries, at this meeting he also introduced the Beatles to marijuana. Aronowitz also claimed that Dylan wrote the song "Mr. Tambourine Man" while staying in Aronowitz's Berkeley Heights, New Jersey home.

Aronowitz was the original manager of The Velvet Underground, getting the band their first gig in the auditorium of the high school in Summit, New Jersey. The Velvet Underground stole Aronowitz's tape recorder and dumped him weeks later when they met Andy Warhol.

Beginning in the later 1960s, Aronowitz wrote the Pop Scene column for the New York Post; he was fired in 1972 for conflict of interest because of his management of bands.

Publications
Aronowitz self-published two books, Bob Dylan and the Beatles and Bobby Darin Was a Friend of Mine; Mick and Miles, on Mick Jagger and Miles Davis, was not completed. He maintained the website The Blacklisted Journalist.

Personal life and death
Aronowitz's wife, Ann, died in 1972. He had two sons and a daughter. His son Myles is a photographer who often works as still photographer on feature film productions; his daughter, Brett, is a graphic designer, writer and illustrator.

He died of cancer in Elizabeth, New Jersey on August 1, 2005, at the age of 77.

References

External links
The Blacklisted Journalist
The Blacklisted Journalist, archived on February 11, 2005
CNN obituary
"The Go-Between" by Mike Miliard, The Boston Phoenix, December 3, 2004
"The Rock Journalist At a High Point In Music History" by David Segal, The Washington Post, August 3, 2005
Al Aronowitz on the Poets' Corner.
"The Man Who Invented The Sixties" by Gary Pig Gold, Cosmik Debris, October 2004

American music journalists
1928 births
2005 deaths
Deaths from cancer in New Jersey
People from Berkeley Heights, New Jersey
People from Bordentown, New Jersey
Rutgers University alumni
Bob Dylan
The Beatles